Xana (Asturian) – Female water spirit
Xanthus (Greek)
 Xecotcovach (Mayan) – Bird
 Xelhua (Aztec) – Giant
 Xiao (mythology) (Chinese) – Ape or four-winged bird
 Xing Tian (Chinese) – Headless giant
 Xiuhcoatl (Aztec) – Drought spirit
 Xhindi (Albanian) – Elves

X